The 1992 House elections in Georgia occurred on November 3, 1992 to elect the members of the State of Georgia's delegation to the United States House of Representatives. Georgia had eleven seats in the House, apportioned according to the 1990 United States Census.

These elections were held concurrently with the United States Senate elections of 1992 (including one election in Georgia), the United States House elections in other states, and various state and local elections.

Prior to the elections, Georgia's House delegation consisted of nine Democrats and one Republican. As a result of the 1990 United States Census, Georgia picked up an additional seat for the 1992 U.S. House elections. Two new districts were made, one based in Gwinnett County and another that stretched from Atlanta to Savannah (the predecessors of the modern seventh and fourth districts respectively). In addition Doug Barnard, Jr. and Ben L. Jones were drawn into the same district.

The Democratic-controlled Georgia General Assembly under the leadership of fiercely partisan Speaker of the House Tom Murphy specifically targeted Gingrich, heavily altering the district that Gingrich represented. Gerrymandering split Gingrich's territory among three neighboring districts. Much of the southern portion of Gingrich's district, including his home in Carrollton, was drawn into the Columbus-based 3rd District, represented by five-term Democrat Richard Ray. At the same time, the Assembly created a new, heavily Republican 6th District in Fulton and Cobb counties in the wealthy northern suburbs of Atlanta—-an area that Gingrich had never represented. 

However, Democrats attempt at defeating Gingrich ultimately backfired. Gingrich sold his home in Carrollton and moved to Marietta in the new 6th. He subsequently won a heated primary over state Representative Herman Clark and remained the House of Representatives until 1999. The changes made to Ray's district, which became considerably more urban and Republican than his old territory, contributed to his defeat in the fall to state senator Mac Collins. As of 2020, this is the last election in which Democrats won a majority of congressional districts in Georgia.

Overview

Results

See also 
 United States House of Representatives elections, 1992

References

1992
Georgia
1992 Georgia (U.S. state) elections